Thomas Scott (born April 21, 1958) is an American politician, radio talk show host, and realtor.

Life and career
Scott was born in 1958. He attended Southern Connecticut State University, but did not graduate. He was first elected to the Connecticut Senate in 1980, becoming the youngest state senator ever seated. He served in the Connecticut Senate between 1981 and 1991 as a Republican from Milford. Scott was known for his vehement opposition to the income tax, and in 1991, led a protest  of 40,000 people against the tax. Scott campaigned for a seat in the United States House of Representatives from Connecticut's 3rd congressional district in 1990, losing to Democrat Rosa DeLauro. He then founded the Connecticut Taxpayers Committee. Scott faced DeLauro for a second time in 1992, and lost again. After leaving the state legislature, he worked as a real estate broker and, starting in 1993, a radio talk show host for WPOP. He contested the 1994 Connecticut gubernatorial election as an independent and lost. In January 1995, Scott returned to radio, hosting a show on WTIC (AM). He subsequently moved to WELI. He hosted the radio show Off Center with Roger Vann until Vann left the station in 1999. In July 2008, Scott rejoined WELI. That October, he interviewed Chris Dodd. WELI chose not to air the interview due to disagreements between cohost and producer Ryan Gorman and Scott, which led to Scott leaving the station. WERC (AM) in Birmingham, Alabama, another Clear Channel Communications affiliate station, later posted the interview to its website.

In 2011, Scott aided the successful state senate campaign of Len Suzio. He joined Linda McMahon's second U. S. Senate campaign in February 2012.

References

1958 births
Living people
Republican Party Connecticut state senators
American real estate brokers
Southern Connecticut State University alumni
People from Milford, Connecticut
American talk radio hosts
Radio personalities from Connecticut